Shahrul Igwan bin Samsudin (born 17 May 1994) is a Malaysian footballer for Kelantan. He primarily plays as a defensive midfielder and as an attacking midfielder.

Club career

Early year
Born in Alor Setar, Kedah, Shahrul joined the Bukit Jalil Sports School at the age of 14, and been promoted to Harimau Muda team at the age 18. His career has started with Kedah under 12 in 2004 represented the State in numerous tournament.

When the Harimau Muda squad played in the Singapore league (2014, 2015), Shahrul was a key player for the squad, making 42 appearances and scoring four goals.

Negeri Sembilan
After Harimau Muda team been dissolved in 2015, Shahrul signed two-years contract with his hometown side Negeri Sembilan.

Selangor
On 4 December 2017, Shahrul signed a one-year contract with Malaysia Super League club Selangor on a free transfer.

Kedah
Shahrul joined his homestate Kedah in 2019 . He is part of Kedah FA Cup Champion 2019,  1st runner up Malaysia Cup and Unity Shield Champion 2019.

UiTM

Following year Shahrul signed a one-year contract with UiTM FC

International career

Shahrul played for various Malaysian national youth teams, such as the under-16 and under-19 teams. With the under-16 team, he was a regular in the team making 25 appearances and scoring four goals. In 2009, Shahrul was called up to the Malaysia U-16 for 2010 AFC U-16 Championship qualification.

Career statistics

Club

Honours

Club
Kedah 
 Malaysia FA Cup: 2019

References

External links
 

1996 births
Living people
Malaysian footballers
Selangor FA players
Negeri Sembilan FA players
Malaysia Super League players
Malaysian people of Malay descent
People from Negeri Sembilan
Association football wingers
Association football midfielders